The Clarence Hotel is a four-star 51-room hotel located at 6–8 Wellington Quay, Dublin, Ireland. It is in the Temple Bar neighbourhood, on the River Liffey. It was built in 1852, and bought by U2 lead singer Bono and lead guitarist The Edge and their business partners in 1992, and opened after refurbishment in 1996.

The hotel was constructed on land that was originally reclaimed for the building of the Old Custom House around 1704.

History
In 1992, Bono and U2 lead guitarist The Edge bought and later refurbished the two-star 70-room hotel, and converted it into a "contemporary boutique" 49-room hotel. After an 18-month renovation costing US$8 million, enabled in part, due to a tax-exemption scheme which aimed to revive the Temple Bar district the hotel re-opened in 1996. As of 2019, while the hotel building was owned by Bono, the Edge and developer Paddy McKillen Sr., its leasehold is held by a company called Press Up Entertainment (owned by developers Paddy McKillen jnr and Matt Ryan). This company manages the hotel's operations.

The hotel's main restaurant, Cleaver East, replaced The Tea Rooms in July 2013.

Expansion proposals

In 2004, plans were announced for an expansion of the hotel, which would include adjoining properties 9 Essex Street and 9, 10 and 11 Wellington Quay. All of the historic buildings would be gutted, leaving just the façades. Everything else would be new. The budget was projected at US$237.2 million. There was opposition from historic preservation groups including An Taisce, but support from some city agencies. The proposed project was approved in 2008 by An Bord Pleanála, the Irish planning appeals agency. However, the planning approval for these plans expired in 2013.

The hotel lost money during the early 21st century recession, but returned to profitability as of 2011.

Media
In September 2000, a month before the release of the U2 album All That You Can't Leave Behind, a live version of the song "Beautiful Day" was filmed on the rooftop of The Clarence Hotel
for the BBC programme Top of the Pops. It is featured on the extra features of the Elevation 2001: Live from Boston DVD (although it is incorrectly labelled on the DVD as "Toronto, Canada").

References

External links

 

Hotel buildings completed in 1852
Tourist attractions in Dublin (city)
Hotels in Dublin (city)
1852 establishments in Ireland